Baqiyatallah University of Medical Sciences (بقية‌الله lit. What is Left ˹as a Lawful Gain˺ by Allah) (BMSU) is a public and special medical university in Tehran, Iran.

The BMSU was founded in 1994 as the primary medical institution for the Islamic Revolutionary Guard Corps (IRGC). The BMSU as well as the Institute of Research for Military Medicine is operated by the IRGC and currently trains students up to Ph.D.

The BMSU operates three hospitals, among them the large Baqiyatallah Hospital near Vanak, Tehran, as well as a dental hospital.
The Baghiyyatollah hospital and University are established by Islamic Revolutionary Guard Corps (Sepah Pasdaran military organisation).

Schools
Medical School
BMSU Medical School is the first school in the BMSU and offers MD and physician assistant/associate programs.
Nursing School
Public Health School
Dentistry School

See also
List of universities in Iran
List of hospitals in Iran

References

External links
Official website

Medical schools in Iran
Universities in Iran
Universities in Tehran
Educational institutions established in 1994
1994 establishments in Iran